The 1954 Iowa gubernatorial election was held on November 2, 1954. Republican nominee Leo Hoegh, who had beaten William H. Nicholas for the Republican nomination, defeated Democratic nominee Clyde E. Herring with 51.37% of the vote. On November 21st, in the aftermath of Governor-elect Hoegh's election. outgoing Governor William Beardsley died in a car crash, thrusting Lt Governor Leo Elthon to serve as Governor until Hoegh's term began.

General election

Candidates
Major party candidates
Leo Hoegh, Republican
Clyde E. Herring, Democratic 

Other candidates
Howard H. Tyler, Independent

Results

References

1954
Iowa
Gubernatorial